Ira Ellsworth Smith (July 7, 1864 – March 21, 1948) was a member of the Wisconsin State Assembly.

Biography
Smith was born on July 7, 1864 in Burnett, Wisconsin, the son of Ira James Smith (1838–1911) and Harriet Ann Lawrence Smith (1835–1898). On September 25, 1889, Smith married Minnie D. Pettis (1865–1945). They had three children. Smith died in Cassian, Wisconsin on March 21, 1948 following a heart attack three days earlier.

Career
Smith was elected to the Assembly in 1918 as a Republican. Other positions he served in include chairman (similar to mayor) and assessor of Cassian, Wisconsin, treasurer of the school board, chairman of the County Board of Oneida County, Wisconsin, and a supervisor of Eau Galle, Dunn County, Wisconsin.

References

External links

People from Burnett, Wisconsin
People from Dunn County, Wisconsin
People from Oneida County, Wisconsin
Republican Party members of the Wisconsin State Assembly
County supervisors in Wisconsin
Wisconsin city council members
Mayors of places in Wisconsin
School board members in Wisconsin
1864 births
1948 deaths